Hinata Terayama (born 19 January 2001) is a retired Japanese kickboxer. A professional competitor from 2016 until 2022, Terayama held the RISE Mini Flyweight championship, the J-Girls Mini Flyweight championship, and was the 2020 RISE Queen of Queens Tournament winner.

She was ranked as a top ten female pound for pound kickboxer by Combat Press from November 2020 until her retirement in March 2022, peaking at #3. She was the 2020 Combat Press "Female Fighter of the Year".

Kickboxing career

J-GIRLS
Terayama made her professional debut against C-CHAN in May 2016. She won the fight by unanimous decision.

Terayama won four of her next five fights, with decision wins against Mei Umeno, MARI, and an extra round decision against Miho, as well as a knockout victory over Miyako Mitsuhori. Hinata fought a majority draw with MISAKI.

In September 2017, Terayama fought a rematch with MISAKI for the J-GIRLS Mini Flyweight title. Hinata would lose the fight by unanimous decision.

Terayama rebounded with a three fight winning streak, defeating RINA, Momi and Miki Kitamura, to once again earn a chance to fight for the J-GIRLS Mini Flyweight title. She won the rubber match with MISAKI by unanimous decision.

In her next fight, Terayama was scheduled to fight Mio Tsumura. Tsumura won the fight by majority decision. Terayama won her next fight against Maki Goto by unanimous decision.

RISE

RISE Mini Flyweight champion
Two months later, during RISE 134, Terayama fought Reina Sato for the inaugural RISE Queen Mini Flyweight title. She won the fight by unanimous decision.

Contuinuing to fight with RISE, Terayama won her next three fights, winning decision against Momi, KOKOZ and Sasori.

Terayama participated in the 2020 RISE Queen of Queens Tournament. In the quarterfinals, she fought Erika♡. The fight went into an extra round, after which Terayama won a decision. In the semifinals, she fought a rematch with Sasori, and won by split decision. In the finals, Hinata fought a rubber match with Momi, and won the fight by unanimous decision. Terayama won a cash prize of 3 million yen which is the biggest amount in Japanese kickboxing history for a women's tournament.

Terayama was scheduled to fight Aida Looksaikongdin at RISE El Dorado, held in February 2021. Aida was unable to enter Japan due to travel restrictions imposed by the COVID-19 pandemic, and was replaced by Suzuka Tabuchi. Terayama beat Tabuchi by unanimous decision.

Terayama was scheduled to defend her RISE title against AKARI on May 15, 2021. Terayama won the fight by unanimous decision, winning 48-47 on all three judges scorecards.

Terayama was scheduled to fight the RISE Women's Flyweight champion Manazo Kobayashi at RISE GIRLS POWER 5. The fight will be contested at a 49.5 kg catchweight. Terayama won the fight by majority decision, with scores of 30-29, 30-29 and 29-29.

Terayama announced her retirement from the sport on March 15, 2022, after undergoing surgery on her right hip.

Titles and accomplishments

Professional
RISE
 2020 RISE Queen of Queens Tournament Winner
 2019 RISE Queen Mini Flyweight Championship 
One successful title defense
J-NETWORK
 2018 J-GIRLS Mini Flyweight Champion

Amateur
 2013 Bigbang -37kg Champion
 2014 Bigbang -40kg Champion
 2014 MA Kick Jr -42kg Champion
 Bigbang Women -45kg Champion
 2014 J-NETWORK All Japan Women's B-League -46kg Champion
 2015 PRE J-GIRLS -46kg Tournament Winner

Awards
2020 Combat Press Kickboxing Awards: Female Fighter of the Year

Kickboxing record

|-  style="text-align:center; background:#cfc"
| 2021-09-12 || Win || align=left| Manazo Kobayashi || RISE GIRLS POWER 5|| Tokyo, Japan || Decision (Majority) ||3  ||3:00
|-  style="text-align:center; background:#cfc;"
| 2021-05-16 || Win || align=left| AKARI || RISE on Abema 2|| Tokyo, Japan || Decision (Unanimous) || 5 || 3:00  
|-
! style=background:white colspan=9 |
|-  style="text-align:center; background:#cfc;"
| 2021-02-28 || Win || align=left| Suzuka Tabuchi || RISE Eldorado 2021 || Yokohama, Japan || Decision (Unanimous)  ||3 || 3:00
|-  style="text-align:center; background:#cfc;"
| 2020-11-01|| Win ||align=left| Momi || RISE Dead or Alive Osaka, Queen of Queens Tournament Final || Osaka, Japan || Decision (Unanimous)  || 3||3:00 
|-
! style=background:white colspan=9 |
|-  style="text-align:center; background:#cfc;"
| 2020-11-01|| Win ||align=left| Sasori || RISE Dead or Alive Osaka, Queen of Queens Tournament Semi Final || Osaka, Japan || Decision (Split) || 3 || 3:00
|-  style="text-align:center; background:#cfc;"
| 2020-10-11||Win||align=left| Erika♡ || RISE DEAD OR ALIVE 2020 Yokohama, Queen of Queens Tournament Quarter Final||  Yokohama, Japan || Ext.R Decision (Unanimous) || 4 || 3:00
|-  style="text-align:center; background:#cfc;"
| 2020-07-19|| Win ||align=left| Sasori || RISE 140 || Tokyo, Japan || Ext.R Decision (Unanimous) || 4 || 3:00
|-  style="text-align:center; background:#cfc;"
| 2020-02-11|| Win ||align=left| KOKOZ || RISE GIRLS POWER 2 || Tokyo, Japan || Decision (Unanimous) || 3 || 3:00
|-  style="text-align:center; background:#cfc;"
| 2019-11-08|| Win ||align=left| Momi || RISE GIRLS POWER || Tokyo, Japan || Decision (Unanimous) || 3 || 3:00
|-  style="text-align:center; background:#cfc;"
| 2019-09-29|| Win ||align=left| Reina Sato || RISE 134 || Tokyo, Japan || Decision (Unanimous) || 5 || 3:00 
|-
! style=background:white colspan=9 |
|-  style="text-align:center; background:#cfc;"
| 2019-07-05|| Win ||align=left| Maki Goto|| RISE 133 || Tokyo, Japan || Decision (Unanimous) || 3 || 3:00
|-  style="text-align:center; background:#fbb;"
| 2019-02-11|| Loss||align=left| MIO|| Shoot Boxing 2019 act.1 || Tokyo, Japan || Decision (Majority) || 3 || 3:00
|-  style="text-align:center; background:#cfc;"
| 2018-11-18|| Win ||align=left| MISAKI || J-NETWORK "J-FIGHT ＆ J-GIRLS 2018 ～4th～" || Tokyo, Japan || Decision (Unanimous) || 5 || 2:00 
|-
! style=background:white colspan=9 |
|-  style="text-align:center; background:#cfc;"
| 2018-07-16|| Win ||align=left| Miki Kitamura|| RISE 126 || Tokyo, Japan || Decision (Unanimous) || 3 || 3:00
|-  style="text-align:center; background:#cfc;"
| 2018-02-25|| Win ||align=left| Momi|| SHINING☆STAR with J-FIGHT & J-GIRLS 2018 || Tokyo, Japan || Decision (Unanimous) || 3 || 2:00
|-  style="text-align:center; background:#cfc;"
| 2017-12-03|| Win ||align=left| RINA || Bigbang 31 || Tokyo, Japan || Decision (Unanimous) || 3 || 2:00
|-  style="text-align:center; background:#fbb;"
| 2017-09-24|| Loss||align=left| MISAKI || J-NETWORK "J-FIGHT＆J-GIRLS 2017～J-NETWORK 20th Anniversary～7th" || Tokyo, Japan || Decision (Unanimous) || 5 || 2:00 
|-
! style=background:white colspan=9 |
|-  style="text-align:center; background:#cfc;"
| 2017-05-28|| Win||align=left| Miho || J-FIGHT & J-GIRLS 2017～J-NETWORK 20th Anniversary～3rd || Tokyo, Japan || Ext.R Decision (Unanimous) || 4 || 2:00
|-  style="text-align:center; background:#c5d2ea;"
| 2017-03-12|| Draw||align=left| MISAKI|| J-FIGHT & J-GIRLS 2017～J-NETWORK 20th Anniversary～ 1st || Tokyo, Japan || Decision (Majority) || 3 || 2:00
|-  style="text-align:center; background:#cfc;"
| 2016-12-25|| Win ||align=left| Miyako Mitsuhori || J-GIRLS 2016～Believe the unbreakable hearts～with J-FIGHT || Tokyo, Japan || KO || 1 || 1:17
|-  style="text-align:center; background:#cfc;"
| 2016-08-28|| Win ||align=left| MARI || J-FIGHT & J-GIRLS 2016 5th || Tokyo, Japan || Decision (Unanimous) || 3 || 2:00
|-  style="text-align:center; background:#cfc;"
| 2016-07-07|| Win ||align=left| Mei Umeno || SHOOT BOXING Girls S-cup 2016 || Tokyo, Japan || Decision (Unanimous) || 3 || 3:00
|-  style="text-align:center; background:#cfc;"
| 2016-05-05|| Win ||align=left| C-CHAN || J-NETWORK J-KICK 2016～Honor the fighting spirits～2nd || Tokyo, Japan || Decision (Unanimous) || 3 || 2:00
|-
| colspan=9 | Legend:    

|-  style="background:#cfc;"
| 2015-08-09|| Win ||align=left| Yuri Kano || RISE ZERO || Tokyo, Japan || Decision (Unanimous) || 2 || 1:30
|-  style="background:#cfc;"
| 2015-06-14|| Win|| align=left| Nana Okuwaki || JAKF SMASHERS 174, Final || Tokyo, Japan || Decision (Unanimous) || ||
|-  style="background:#cfc;"
| 2015-06-14|| Win|| align=left| Ayaka Koyama|| JAKF SMASHERS 174, Semi Final || Tokyo, Japan || Decision (Unanimous) || ||
|-  style="background:#cfc;"
| 2015-03-29|| Win|| align=left| Yumiko Moriya || J-NETWORK All Japan Amateur Championship|| Tokyo, Japan || Decision (Unanimous) ||2 || 1:30
|-  style="background:#cfc;"
| 2015-02-22|| Win ||align=left| Chigusa Tanaka || J-GIRLS 2015 ～Aim for the ace of aces～1st, Pre J-GIRLS Tournament Final || Tokyo, Japan || KO || 1 || 0:49
|-
! style=background:white colspan=9 |
|-  style="background:#cfc;"
| 2015-02-22|| Win ||align=left| Hiroko Yoshida || J-GIRLS 2015 ～Aim for the ace of aces～1st, Pre J-GIRLS Tournament Semi Final || Tokyo, Japan || Decision (Unanimous) || 1 || 1:30
|-  style="background:#cfc;"
| 2015-02-22|| Win ||align=left| Sara Yoshio || J-GIRLS 2015 ～Aim for the ace of aces～1st, Pre J-GIRLS Tournament Quarter Final || Tokyo, Japan || Decision (Unanimous) || 1 || 1:30
|-  bgcolor="#fbb"
| 2014-12-21|| Loss||align=left| Momoka Yoshikawa ||All Japan Amateur Shoot Boxing || Tokyo, Japan || Decision (Unanimous) ||2 || 
|-
! style=background:white colspan=9 |
|-  style="background:#cfc;"
| 2014-11-23|| Win|| align=left| Rinka Sato || 10th J-NETWORK All Japan Championship, Women's B-League -46kg Final|| Tokyo, Japan || Decision (Unanimous) || ||
|-
! style=background:white colspan=9 |
|-  style="background:#cfc;"
| 2014-11-23|| Win|| align=left| Hayakawa || 10th J-NETWORK All Japan Championship, Women's B-League -46kg Semi Final|| Tokyo, Japan || Decision (Unanimous) || ||
|-  style="background:#cfc;"
| 2014-08-24|| Win|| align=left| Shunka Date || J-GROW 44 ～Oomori Survival 2014～|| Tokyo, Japan || KO ||2 ||
|-  style="background:#cfc;"
| 2014-08-24|| Win|| align=left| Toyoshige Miyazawa || J-GROW 44 ～Oomori Survival 2014～|| Tokyo, Japan || KO ||1 ||
|-  style="background:#fbb;"
| 2014-06-01|| Loss ||align=left| Kohei Watanabe || Bigbang Amateur 21 || Tokyo, Japan ||  Decision || 2 || 1:30
|-  style="background:#cfc;"
| 2014-04-13 || Win ||align=left| Kenji Kawata || MA Nihon Kick DRAGON.5 ～THE ONE AND ONLY～ || Kanagawa, Japan || Decision (Unanimous) || 3 || 2:00
|-
! style=background:white colspan=9 |
|-  style="background:#cfc;"
| 2014-02-23|| Win|| align=left| Ryotaro Uchida || Bigbang Amateur 19|| Tokyo, Japan || Decision ||3 ||2:00
|-
! style=background:white colspan=9 |
|-  style="background:#fbb;"
| 2013-10-13|| Loss || align=left| Reito Yoshida || Bigbang Amateur 17, -40kg Tournament Final|| Tokyo, Japan || Decision ||3 ||2:00
|-  style="background:#cfc;"
| 2013-10-13|| Win|| align=left| Reina Sato || Bigbang Amateur 17, -40kg Tournament Semi Final|| Tokyo, Japan || Decision ||2 ||2:00
|-  style="background:#cfc;"
| 2013-09-01|| Win|| align=left| Michitaka Yamaguchi || Bigbang Amateur 16|| Tokyo, Japan || Decision ||3 ||2:00
|-
! style=background:white colspan=9 |
|-  style="background:#cfc;"
| 2013-07-14|| Win || align=left| Daiya Kakuta || Bigbang Amateur 15|| Tokyo, Japan || Decision (Unanimous) ||2 ||1:30
|-  style="background:#c5d2ea;"
| 2013-07-14|| Draw || align=left| Reito Yoshida || Bigbang Amateur 15|| Tokyo, Japan || Decision ||2 ||1:30
|-  style="background:#cfc;"
| 2013-06-02|| Win || align=left| Taison Suzuki || Bigbang Amateur 14|| Tokyo, Japan || Decision (Unanimous)||2 ||1:30
|-  style="background:#fbb;"
| 2013-06-02|| Loss || align=left| Riichi Hosono || Bigbang Amateur 14|| Tokyo, Japan || Decision (Majority)||2 ||1:30
|-  style="background:#cfc;"
| 2013-03-10|| Win|| align=left| Ryunosuke Suzuki ||Bigbang the future VI|| Tokyo, Japan || Decision ||3 ||2:00
|-
! style=background:white colspan=9 |
|-
| colspan=9 | Legend:

See also
List of female kickboxers

References

Living people
2001 births
Japanese female kickboxers
Sportspeople from Gunma Prefecture